The Luvvies was an annual spoof awards ceremony that presented celebrities with awards that they "don't want". The awards ran twice, with the first in February 2003, and the second in January 2004. Both ceremonies were hosted by the Scottish comedian Rhona Cameron. They took place at Teddington Studios in London, and were broadcast on ITV1. Award categories included Love Rats, Naked Ambition and Ego of the Year; each category had a shortlist of three celebrities. During the ceremony, the shortlist for each category was read out, along with some footage of each nominee to illustrate the reason for their inclusion. The winner was then announced, followed by footage of him or her being doorstepped and presented with their trophy. Some winners, such as Patsy Palmer and Edwina Currie, accepted their awards, while others, such as Boy George and David Blaine, did not. A few winners, such as Simon Cowell and Jordan, showed up at the ceremony to receive their trophy in person.

Critical reaction to The Luvvies was generally negative. Writing about the 2004 awards, Frances Traynor of the Daily Record summarised the ceremony as "the show viewers really don't want to watch" and noted that "even Rhona Cameron looked bored". TV critic Charlie Brooker was particularly scathing, writing that the awards had "enraged" him and that "harassing the heartbroken for funnies is disgraceful". Cameron argued that "the key to accepting a Luvvie is not to take yourself too seriously", and said that if she were presented with a Luvvie she would "welcome it with open arms – otherwise you might look a bit po-faced and silly".

Awards

2003

2004

References

Annual events in the United Kingdom
Awards disestablished in 2004
Awards established in 2003
British awards
British television specials
Ironic and humorous awards